François Paul de Neufville de Villeroy (1677–1731) was archbishop of Lyon from 15 August 1714 to 6 February 1731. He was a member of the Neufville de Villeroy family.

1677 births
1731 deaths
Archbishops of Lyon
18th-century Roman Catholic archbishops in France
18th century in Lyon